St Ursula's Convent School is a Roman Catholic secondary school for girls, located in the Greenwich area of the Royal Borough of Greenwich in London, England.

St Ursula's is a voluntary aided school, and is part of the Ursuline Order within the Roman Catholic Archdiocese of Southwark. The school is also part of the Greenwich Local Authority, and coordinates with Greenwich London Borough Council for admissions.

The school offers GCSEs and BTECs as programmes of study for pupils. St Ursula's has a specialism in Humanities and has additional resources for the specialism. The school is also designated as a Teaching School.

Notable former pupils
Margaret Moran, former Labour Party member of Parliament
Adelaide Damoah

References

External links
 St Ursula's Convent School official website

Secondary schools in the Royal Borough of Greenwich
Ursuline schools
Catholic secondary schools in the Archdiocese of Southwark
Girls' schools in London
Voluntary aided schools in London